Woonsocket State Bank, located at 201 S. Dumont Ave. in Woonsocket, South Dakota, was built in 1906.  It was listed on the National Register of Historic Places in 2002.

It is Early Commercial in style.  It has also been known as Sanborn County Bank.

It was deemed notable "for the distinctive architectural style of Commercial. The Bank, constructed in 1906 is a well-preserved example of the Commercial style in a rural town setting."  It was also noted that it "is the only remaining building in the main commercial area with any historical integrity."

References

Bank buildings on the National Register of Historic Places in South Dakota
Early Commercial architecture in the United States
Commercial buildings completed in 1906
Sanborn County, South Dakota
1906 establishments in South Dakota